Who's Got Trouble? is an album by Shivaree, released by Zoë Records in 2005. It has been called "dark cabaret pop."

Track listing

Personnel
Ambrosia Parsley – Vocals
Duke McVinnie – Guitar
Danny McGough – Keyboards

Reception

CMJ New Music Monthly said that "much of the album tends to give off a background ambience" and that "Shivaree's nouveaux lounge, old-timey cabaret flare trickles with an underlying bizarreness that smacks of one of those hypnotic late-night excursions so common in David Lynch films."

Billboard Magazine said that "while the musicianship of the group is indisputable, Parsley's unusual childish voice is stunted by pedestrian songwriting."

The Torontoist called the album "fascinating and almost unsettling in its uniqueness."

Stylus Magazine argued that although "they may have shrunk their range and scope slightly, the songwriting and execution is as strong as ever."

Phoenix New Times believed that "despite the low volume, this album delivers an emotional knockout punch."

Chart performance

References

Shivaree (band) albums
2005 albums
Albums produced by Victor Van Vugt